Edmund Denis Casey (2 January 1933 – 1 May 2006), known as Ed, was best known as the leader of the Australian Labor Party in Queensland between 1978 and 1982. He also served as Primary Industries Minister in the government of Wayne Goss between 1989 and 1995. Casey was the member for Mackay in the Legislative Assembly of Queensland between 1969 and 1995.

Early life and career
Of Irish Catholic background, Casey started his working life as a bank clerk before entering his family's construction business. He was active in local government, becoming deputy mayor of the City of Mackay. Shortly before the 1969 election, he won Labor Party preselection for the seat of Mackay in the state parliament. He lost preselection for the Labor Party in 1972, after opposing the then dominant, left-wing faction in Trades Hall. But he was re-elected twice without Labor Party endorsement, as an independent Labor candidate, for example running under the banner of 'The True Labor Party'.

Political career

Leader of the Labor Party
Casey was readmitted to the Labor caucus in 1977. In November 1978 he became Labor leader, replacing Tom Burns who had resigned unexpectedly. He led Labor into the 1980 election but failed to achieve more than a small swing against the Coalition Government led by Joh Bjelke-Petersen, and as a result his own authority within the state ALP was diminished.

Casey made an offer to the Queensland Liberal Party after the 1980 election to form a bipartisan alliance, with the aim of opposing the electoral malapportionment from which Bjelke-Petersen benefited, and of putting in its place a system of one-vote-one-value. Relations between the Liberals and the National Party in the Coalition were poor, with the Liberal Party  being disadvantaged (though less severely than the ALP) by the prevailing pro-National gerrymander. Casey renewed his offer in 1982 when relations within the Coalition were still bad, but the offer was again rebuffed, despite a Liberal Convention in June voting against the existing electoral system. The following October, Casey lost the ALP leadership to Keith Wright.

Minister
Casey remained popular in his electorate, despite no longer being party leader, and was re-elected comfortably in both the 1983 and the 1986 elections. By 1986, the popularity of the National Party had declined and the Coalition with the Liberals had acrimoniously ended. In late 1989 the ALP won its first Queensland election for 32 years. Wayne Goss thus became the new Premier, after the Fitzgerald Inquiry had uncovered serious problems with corruption in the Queensland police force.

Goss appointed Casey as his Primary Industries Minister. In this role, Casey reformed the sugar industry, established agricultural academies, and set up a drought relief task force. But his health had declined, with diabetes having aggravated his long-standing weight problems, and in 1995 he resigned from both the ministry and the parliament. He died of a stroke on 1 May 2006.

While Casey never became premier, and spent in opposition many of what should have been his most productive years, he remained a very popular member of his seat of Mackay. At the last election which he contested (1992), he achieved the rare feat of winning every single voting booth in the constituency.

References

External links 
  Courier Mail "Ed Casey dies" 2 May 2006
  AAP News on Yahoo "Former Qld ALP boss Casey a visionary" 2 May 2006
  2004 Queensland Elections Mackay on ABC Online
 Photo here: 

1933 births
2006 deaths
Australian Labor Party members of the Parliament of Queensland
Australian people of Irish descent
Leaders of the Opposition in Queensland
20th-century Australian politicians